Beverley Naidoo is a South African author of children's books who lives in the UK. Her first three novels featured life in South Africa where she lived until her twenties. She has also written a biography of the trade unionist Neil Aggett.

The Other Side of Truth, published by Puffin in 2000, is a story about Nigerian political refugees in England. For that work she won the annual Carnegie Medal from the Library Association, recognising the year's best children's book by a British subject.

Naidoo won the Josette Frank Award twice – in 1986 for Journey to Jo'burg and in 1997 for No Turning Back: A Novel of South Africa.

Biography

Beverley Naidoo  was born on 21 May 1943 in Johannesburg, South Africa. She grew up under apartheid laws that gave privilege to white children. Black children were sent to separate, inferior schools and their families were told where they could live, work and travel. Apartheid denied all children the right to grow up together with equality, justice and respect.

She graduated from the University of Witwatersrand in 1963. As a student, Beverley began to question racism and the idea that white people were superior. Her involvement with the anti-apartheid movement in South Africa led to her being imprisoned in solitary confinement for eight weeks at the age of 21. She left for England in 1965 and studied at the University of York with the help of a United Nations Bursary, training to become a teacher. She taught both primary and secondary children in London for 18 years. She obtained a Ph.D. from the University of Southampton in 1991 and worked as Adviser for Cultural Diversity and English in Dorset. She has tutored Creative Writing at Goldsmiths College, University of London, and run workshops for young people and adults in Britain and abroad, including for the British Council. 
She married another South African exile. Apartheid laws forbade marriage between white and black people and barred them living together with their children in South Africa.

As a child Beverley always loved stories but only started writing when her own children were growing up. Her first book, Journey to Jo'burg, won The Other Award in Britain. It opened a window onto children's struggles under apartheid. In South Africa it was banned until 1991, the year after Nelson Mandela was released from jail. A few years later, when the parents of all South African children had the right to vote for the first time, Nelson Mandela was elected president.

Books

Journey to Jo'burg, Chain of Fire and Out of Bounds are set in South Africa under apartheid, while No Turning Back concerns the experiences of a boy trying to survive on the streets of Johannesburg in the immediate post-apartheid years. The Other Side of Truth and its sequel, Web of Lies, deal with the experiences of the children of an outspoken Nigerian writer as they seek political asylum in England. Her 2007 novel Burn My Heart has an imagined point of reference in the boyhood in Kenya of a second cousin, Neil Aggett, being set in the 1950s during the Mau Mau Uprising.

Beverley Naidoo has also written several picture books, featuring children from Botswana and England. In 2004, she wrote the picture book Baba's Gift, set in contemporary South Africa, with her daughter, Maya Naidoo. In The Great Tug of War and Other Stories she retells African folktales, the precursors of the Brer Rabbit tales.

Works

Journey to Jo'burg (1985)
Chain of Fire (1989), sequel to Journey to Jo'burg
Through Whose Eye? Exploring Racism: reader, text and context (1992), nonfiction
No Turning Back (1995)
The Other Side of Truth (2000)
The Great Tug of War and other stories (2001), retellings
Out of Bounds: Stories of Conflict and Hope (2003)
Web of Lies (2004), sequel to The Other Side of Truth
Making It Home: Real-life Stories from Children Forced to Flee (with Kate Holt) 
Burn My Heart (2007)
Call of the Deep (2008), retellings
Death of an Idealist (2012)

Picture books
Letang and Julie Save the Day (1994)
Letang's New Friend (1994)
Trouble for Letang and Julie (1994)
Where Is Zami? (1998)
King Lion in Love (2004)
Baba's Gift (2004), by Beverley and Maya Naidoo
S Is for South Africa
Aesop's Fables, a retelling with illustrations by Piet Grobler

References

External links
 
 Writers: Beverley Naidoo at British Council Literature
 Resources on Beverley Naidoo's The Other Side of Truth (La Clé des langues)

South African children's writers
South African writers
Carnegie Medal in Literature winners
Alumni of the University of York
1943 births
Living people
South African women children's writers
20th-century South African women writers
21st-century South African women writers
South African people of Indian descent